Social Anthropology (French: Anthropologie Sociale) is a quarterly peer-reviewed academic journal published since 2007 by Wiley-Blackwell on behalf of the European Association of Social Anthropologists. It was established in 1992 and originally published by Cambridge University Press. The editors-in-chief are Laia Soto Bermant and Nikolai Ssorin-Chaikov. Articles are published in English or French.

In 2019, the journal began publishing up to two additional supplementary issues of online-only, special thematic content.

According to the Journal Citation Reports, the journal has a 2019 impact factor of 1.639.

Editors-in-chief
The following people have been editors-in-chief:
 2020- : Laia Soto Bermant and Nikolai Ssorin-Chaikov
2015-2019: Sarah Green, Patrick Laviolette
2011-2014: Mark Maguire, David Berliner
2007-2011: Dorle Dracklé, Helena Wulff
2003-2007: Peter Pels
2000-2003: Eduardo Archetti
1992-1999: Jean-Claude Galey

Open access
As of June 3, 2021, Berghahn Journals announced that Social Anthropology/Anthropologie Sociale would become part of their open-access set of anthropology journals, starting with Volume 30 in 2022.  EASA members "voted overwhelmingly" to leave their existing publisher, Wiley, and  "to take our journal Open Access in a way that is sustainable and equitable."

Abstracts & Indexing
The journal is indexed in the following catalogues:

 Anthropological Index Online
 Anthropological Literature
 British and Irish Archaeological Bibliography
 Current Contents
 Expanded Academic ASAP
 InfoTrac
 ProQuest
 Psychological Abstracts
 Social Sciences Citation Index
 SocINDEX
 Web of Science

References

External links
 
 Journal page at publisher's website
 Print: 
 Online: 

Anthropology journals
Quarterly journals
Multilingual journals
Wiley-Blackwell academic journals
Publications established in 1992